Heronymivka is a village (selo) in central Ukraine. It belongs to Ruska Poliana rural hromada, one of the hromadas of Ukraine.

History
The name of the village is related to the former Cherkasy starosta (elder) and Voivode of Volhynia Hieronim Janusz Sanguszko and according to the "Tales about populated localities of Kiev Governorate" of 1864 by Lavrentiy Polkhylevych, it was founded sometime in the 18th century.

In 1930 in the village was established OGPU collective farm (kolkhoz) along with the Communist party cell.

During World War II, Heronymivka was occupied by Nazi Germany from 22 August 1941 to 17 November 1943.

The village was retaken by the Soviet troops. Among the first liberators was a self-propelled battery (SU-122) commanded by Lieutenant Petro Vernyhora (a native of Tarashcha) who perished three days later near the Cherkasy train station and later was buried in Heronymivka.

For quite some time Halyna Burkatska played an important role in the village.

In 1950 OGPU kolkhoz merged with other artels of neighboring villages and was renamed as "Radianska Ukrayina" (Soviet Ukraine).

In 1982 kolkhoz was turned into a soviet farm.

References

External links
 
 Heronymivka, Cherkasy Raion, Cherkasy Oblast (Геронимівка, Черкаський район, Черкаська область). The History of Cities and Villages of the Ukrainian SSR – Cherkasy Oblast. Kiev, 1972. 

Villages in Cherkasy Raion